Shine On, Harvest Moon is a 1938 American Western film directed by Joseph Kane and starring Roy Rogers and Mary Hart. Written by Jack Natteford, the film is about a crazed outlaw who looks up a former partner, who has "gone straight", and tries to blackmail him with his past into resuming a life of crime. When this plan fails, the outlaw and his two psychopathic sons re-establish their gang and begin a wave of violence and rustling in the surrounding area, and arrange evidence that his former partner is the actual criminal. The partner's daughter engages the sympathy of Roy Rogers in bringing the truth to light and the real villains to justice. The supporting cast includes Stanley Andrews and William Farnum, and features Lulu Belle and Scotty in their only film appearance.

Plot summary

Cast
 Roy Rogers as Roy Rogers
 Mary Hart as Claire Brower (as Mary Hart)
 Myrtle Wiseman as Lulu Belle (as Lulu Belle and Scotty)
 Scotty Wiseman as Scotty (as Lulu Belle and Scotty)
 Stanley Andrews as Pa Jackson
 William Farnum as Milt Brower
 Frank Jaquet as Homer Sheldon
 Chester Gunnels as Chester
 Matty Roubert as Ben Jackson
 Pat Henning as Shag Jackson
 Jack Rockwell as Foreman Jim Mason
 Joe Whitehead as Sheriff Clay

References

External links
 
 
 
 
 

1938 films
1938 Western (genre) films
American black-and-white films
American Western (genre) films
Films directed by Joseph Kane
1930s American films
1930s English-language films